Tanah Boyd (born 28 July 2000) is an Australian professional rugby league footballer who plays as a  and  for the Gold Coast Titans in the NRL.

Background
Boyd was born in Penrith, New South Wales, Australia.

A Runaway Bay Seagulls junior, Boyd attended Keebra Park State High School, before being signed by the Brisbane Broncos. In 2017, Boyd was a member of Keebra Park's ARL Schoolboy Cup winning side and was selected for the Australian Schoolboys on their tour of New Zealand. Boyd's father, Shayne, is a former first grade player, playing for the Penrith Panthers and Balmain Tigers.

Playing career

Early career
In 2016, Boyd played for Gold Coast White in the Cyril Connell Cup and was selected in the Queensland under-16 side. In 2017, he joined the Souths Logan Magpies, playing for their Mal Meninga Cup side, and was selected in the Queensland under-18 side. In 2018, he began the season playing for the Magpies' Mal Meninga Cup side, who won the Grand Final but lost to the Penrith Panthers in the under-18 National Title game. Later that season, he made his Hastings Deering Colts and Queensland Cup debut for Souths Logan, and was again selected in the Queensland under-18 side.

2019
In 2019, Boyd moved up to the Brisbane Broncos NRL squad on a development contract.

On 12 June, he made a mid-season move to the Gold Coast Titans, signing with the club until the end of the 2021 NRL season. He began playing for their Queensland Cup feeder side, the Burleigh Bears. On 30 June, he was selected in the Queensland under-20 team, coming off the bench in their loss to New South Wales.

In Round 24 of the 2019 NRL season, Boyd made his NRL debut for the Gold Coast against the Newcastle Knights.

2020
Boyd played 13 games for the Gold Coast in the 2020 NRL season as the club finished ninth on the table and missed the finals.

2021
Boyd was limited to only six matches in the 2021 NRL season.  Boyd did not play in the Gold Coast's elimination finals loss to the Sydney Roosters.

2022
In round 25 of the 2022 NRL season, Boyd kicked a field goal in golden point extra-time to win the game for the Gold Coast 27-26 against the New Zealand Warriors.
Boyd played a total of 18 matches for the Gold Coast throughout the season scoring three tries. The club would endure a difficult season finishing 13th on the table.

2023
In round 3 of the 2023 NRL season, Boyd scored two tries and kicked five goals in the Gold Coast's 38-34 upset victory over Melbourne.

References

External links
Gold Coast Titans profile
NRL profile

2000 births
Living people
Australian rugby league players
Burleigh Bears players
Gold Coast Titans players
Rugby league halfbacks
Rugby league players from Penrith, New South Wales
Souths Logan Magpies players